Robert Alexander Kerr (1 May 1875 – 1 June 1943) was an Australian rules footballer who played with Geelong in the Victorian Football League (VFL).

Notes

External links 

1875 births
1943 deaths
Australian rules footballers from Melbourne
Geelong Football Club players